Horne Lake is located west of Qualicum Beach.  Named after Adam Grant Horne, Hudson's Bay Company storekeeper at Nanaimo, who made the first recorded sighting of this lake in 1856.

References

Alberni Valley
Lakes of Vancouver Island
Alberni Land District